The Ogden Knights were a professional indoor football team that began play in the American Indoor Football Association in the 2009 season. The Knights were based in Ogden, Utah, with home games to be played at the Golden Spike Arena. While it is the first indoor football team based in Ogden, the AIFA previously had the Salt Lake City-area based Utah Saints, who only played the 2008 season before folding.

On November 23, 2008, the Knights announced their nickname, logo, and colors.

The team was forced to abort its 2010 season, but planned on returning in 2011. However, the AIFA folded before the 2011 season began and the Knights did not resume operations Larry Stovall-Moody kicked the first field goal of 46 yards vs Yakima Valley Warriors at the Yakima SunDome in Yakima Washington.

Season-By-Season

|-
|2009 || 4 || 10 || 0 || 3rd Western || --
|-
|2010 || 1 || 13 || 0 || 6th Western || --
|-
!Totals || 5 || 23 || 0 ||

External links 
 Ogden Knights
 News story announcing nickname
 League PR announcing Ogden's entry
 Knights' 2009 Stats
 Knights' 2010 Stats

American football teams in Utah
American Indoor Football Association teams
Sports in Ogden, Utah
American football teams established in 2008
American football teams disestablished in 2011
2008 establishments in Utah
2011 disestablishments in Utah